The Rural Municipality of Rudy No. 284 is a rural municipality (RM) in the Canadian province of Saskatchewan within Census Division No. 11 and  Division No. 5.

History 
The RM of Rudy No. 284 incorporated as a rural municipality on December 13, 1909.

Geography

Communities and localities 
The following urban municipalities are surrounded by the RM.

Towns
 Outlook

Villages
 Broderick
 Glenside

Demographics 

Attractions 
 Brodewrick Reservoir
 Outlook & District Regional Park
 Outlook & District Heritage Museum

Government 
The RM of Rudy No. 284 is governed by an elected municipal council and an appointed administrator that meets on the second and fourth Wednesday of every month. The reeve of the RM is Dennis Fuglerud while its administrator is Tina Douglas. The RM's office is located in Outlook.

Transportation 
 Saskatchewan Highway 15
 Saskatchewan Highway 219
 Saskatchewan Highway 764
 Canadian Pacific Railway (abandoned)

See also 
List of rural municipalities in Saskatchewan

References

External links 

Rudy
Division No. 11, Saskatchewan